

Events

Pre-1600
96 – Domitian, who has been conducting a reign of terror for the past three years, is assassinated as a result of a plot by his wife Domitia and two Praetorian prefects. 
96 – Nerva is proclaimed Roman emperor after Domitian is assassinated.
 324 – Constantine the Great decisively defeats Licinius in the Battle of Chrysopolis, establishing Constantine's sole control over the Roman Empire.
1048 – Battle of Kapetron between a combined Byzantine-Georgian army and a Seljuq army.
1066 – Norwegian king Harald Hardrada lands with Tostig Godwinson at the mouth of the Humber River and begins his invasion of England.
1180 – Philip Augustus becomes king of France at the age of fifteen.
1454 – Thirteen Years' War: In the Battle of Chojnice, the Polish army is defeated by the Teutonic knights.
1544 – The expedition of Juan Bautista Pastene makes landfall in San Pedro Bay, southern Chile, claiming the territory for Spain.

1601–1900
1618 – The twelfth baktun in the Mesoamerican Long Count calendar begins.
1714 – George I arrives in Great Britain after becoming king on August 1.
1739 – The Treaty of Belgrade is signed, whereby Austria cedes lands south of the Sava and Danube rivers to the Ottoman Empire.
1759 – French and Indian War: The Articles of Capitulation of Quebec are signed.
1793 – The first cornerstone of the United States Capitol is laid by George Washington.
1809 – The Royal Opera House in London opens.
1810 – First Government Junta in Chile. Though supposed to rule only during the Peninsular War in Spain, it is in fact the first step towards independence from Spain, and is commemorated as such.
1812 – The 1812 Fire of Moscow dies down after destroying more than three-quarters of the city. Napoleon returns from the Petrovsky Palace to the Moscow Kremlin, spared from the fire.
1837 – Tiffany & Co. (first named Tiffany & Young) is founded by Charles Lewis Tiffany and Teddy Young in New York City. The store is called a "stationery and fancy goods emporium".
1838 – The Anti-Corn Law League is established by Richard Cobden.
1850 – The U.S. Congress passes the Fugitive Slave Act of 1850.
1851 – First publication of The New-York Daily Times, which later becomes The New York Times.
1860 – Second Opium War: Battle of Zhangjiawan: Now heading towards Beijing after having recently occupied Tianjin, the allied Anglo-French force engages and defeats a larger Qing Chinese army at Zhangjiawan.
1862 – The Confederate States celebrate for the first and only time a Thanksgiving Day.
1863 – American Civil War: The Battle of Chickamauga begins between Confederate and Union forces. It involves the second highest amount of casualties for any American Civil War battle apart from Gettysburg.
1864 – American Civil War: John Bell Hood begins the Franklin–Nashville Campaign in an unsuccessful attempt to draw William Tecumseh Sherman back out of Georgia.
1870 – Old Faithful Geyser is observed and named by Henry D. Washburn.
1872 – King Oscar II accedes to the throne of Sweden–Norway.
1873 – The bank Jay Cooke & Company declares bankruptcy, contributing to the Panic of 1873.
1879 – The Blackpool Illuminations are switched on for the first time.
1882 – The Pacific Stock Exchange opens.
1895 – The Atlanta Exposition Speech on race relations is delivered by Booker T. Washington.
1898 – The Fashoda Incident, a territorial dispute between Britain and France, triggers a war scare.

1901–present
1906 – The 1906 Hong Kong typhoon kills an estimated 10,000 people.
1914 – The Irish Home Rule Act becomes law, but is delayed until after World War I.
  1919   – Fritz Pollard becomes the first African American to play professional football for a major team, the Akron Pros.
1922 – The Kingdom of Hungary is admitted to the League of Nations.
1927 – The Columbia Broadcasting System goes on the air.
1928 – Juan de la Cierva makes the first autogyro crossing of the English Channel.
1931 – Imperial Japan instigates the Mukden Incident as a pretext to invade and occupy Manchuria.
1934 – The Soviet Union is admitted to the League of Nations.
1939 – World War II: The Polish government of Ignacy Mościcki flees to Romania.
  1939   – World War II: The radio show Germany Calling begins transmitting Nazi propaganda.
1940 – World War II: The British liner  is sunk by German submarine U-48; those killed include 77 child refugees.
1943 – World War II: Adolf Hitler orders the deportation of Danish Jews.
1944 – World War II: The British submarine  torpedoes Jun'yō Maru, killing 5,600, mostly slave labourers and POWs.
1944 – World War II: The Battle of Arracourt begins. 
1945 – General Douglas MacArthur moves his general headquarters from Manila to Tokyo.
1947 – The National Security Act reorganizes the United States government's military and intelligence services.
1948 – Operation Polo is terminated after the Indian Army accepts the surrender of the army of Hyderabad.
  1948   – Margaret Chase Smith of Maine becomes the first woman elected to the United States Senate without completing another senator's term.
1954 – Finnish president J. K. Paasikivi becomes the first Western head of state to be awarded the highest honor of the Soviet Union, the Order of Lenin.
1960 – Fidel Castro arrives in New York City as the head of the Cuban delegation to the United Nations.
1961 – U.N. Secretary-General Dag Hammarskjöld dies in an air crash while attempting to negotiate peace in the Katanga region of the Democratic Republic of the Congo.
1962 – Burundi, Jamaica, Rwanda and Trinidad and Tobago are admitted to the United Nations.
1973 – The Bahamas, East Germany and West Germany are admitted to the United Nations.
1974 – Hurricane Fifi strikes Honduras with 110 mph winds, killing 5,000 people.
1977 – Voyager I takes the first distant photograph of the Earth and the Moon together.
1980 – Soyuz 38 carries two cosmonauts (including one Cuban) to the Salyut 6 space station.
1981 – The Assemblée Nationale votes to abolish capital punishment in France.
1982 – The Sabra and Shatila massacre in Lebanon comes to an end.
1984 – Joe Kittinger completes the first solo balloon crossing of the Atlantic.
1988 – The 8888 Uprising in Myanmar comes to an end.
  1988   – General Henri Namphy, president of Haiti, is ousted from power in a coup d'état led by General Prosper Avril.
1990 – Liechtenstein becomes a member of the United Nations.
1992 – An explosion rocks Giant Mine at the height of a labor dispute, killing nine replacement workers in Yellowknife, Canada.
1997 – United States media magnate Ted Turner donates US$1 billion to the United Nations.
  1997   – The Anti-Personnel Mine Ban Convention is adopted. 
2001 – First mailing of anthrax letters from Trenton, New Jersey in the 2001 anthrax attacks.
2007 – Buddhist monks join anti-government protesters in Myanmar, starting what some call the Saffron Revolution.
2011 – The 2011 Sikkim earthquake is felt across northeastern India, Nepal, Bhutan, Bangladesh and southern Tibet.
2012 – Greater Manchester Police officers PC Nicola Hughes and PC Fiona Bone are murdered in a gun and grenade ambush attack in Greater Manchester, England.
2014 – Scotland votes against independence from the United Kingdom, by 55% to 45%.
2015 – Two security personnel, 17 worshippers in a mosque, and 13 militants are killed during a Tehrik-i-Taliban Pakistan attack on a Pakistan Air Force base on the outskirts of Peshawar.
2016 – The 2016 Uri attack in Jammu and Kashmir, India by terrorist group Jaish-e-Mohammed results in the deaths of nineteen Indian Army soldiers and all four attackers.
2021 – A ferry capsizes in Guizhou province, China due to bad weather, killing ten people and five missing.

Births

Pre-1600
AD 53 – Trajan, Roman emperor (d. 117)
 524 – Kan B'alam I, ruler of Palenque (d. 583)
1091 – Andronikos Komnenos, Byzantine prince and general (d. 1130/31)
1344 – Marie of France, Duchess of Bar (d. 1404)
1434 – Eleanor of Portugal, Holy Roman Empress (d. 1467)
1501 – Henry Stafford, 1st Baron Stafford (d. 1563)
1554 – Haydar Mirza Safavi, Safavid prince (d. 1576)
1587 – Francesca Caccini, Italian singer-songwriter and lute player (d. 1640)

1601–1900
1606 – Zhang Xianzhong, Chinese rebel leader (d. 1647)
1643 – Gilbert Burnet, Scottish bishop, historian, and theologian (d. 1715)
1676 – Eberhard Louis, Duke of Württemberg (d. 1733)
1684 – Johann Gottfried Walther, German organist and composer (d. 1748)
1709 – Samuel Johnson, English lexicographer and poet (d. 1784)
1711 – Ignaz Holzbauer, Austrian composer and educator (d. 1783)
1733 – George Read, American lawyer and politician, 3rd Governor of Delaware (d. 1798)
1750 – Tomás de Iriarte y Oropesa, Spanish poet and playwright (d. 1791)
1752 – Adrien-Marie Legendre, French mathematician and theorist (d. 1833)
1765 – Pope Gregory XVI (d. 1846)
1779 – Joseph Story, American lawyer, jurist, and politician (d. 1845)
1786 – Christian VIII of Denmark (d. 1848)
  1786   – Justinus Kerner, German poet and author (d. 1862)
1812 – Herschel Vespasian Johnson, American lawyer and politician, 41st Governor of Georgia (d. 1880)
1819 – Léon Foucault, French physicist and academic (d. 1868)
1837 – Aires de Ornelas e Vasconcelos, Portuguese archbishop (d. 1880)
1838 – Anton Mauve, Dutch painter and educator (d. 1888)
1846 – Richard With, Norwegian captain, businessman, and politician, founded Vesteraalens Dampskibsselskab (d. 1930)
1848 – Francis Grierson, English-American pianist and composer (d. 1927)
1857 – John Hessin Clarke, American lawyer and judge (d. 1945)
1858 – Kate Booth, English Salvation Army officer (d. 1955)
1859 – John L. Bates, American lawyer and politician, 41st Governor of Massachusetts (d. 1946)
  1859   – Lincoln Loy McCandless, American businessman and politician (d. 1940)
1860 – Alberto Franchetti, Italian-American composer and educator (d. 1942)
1870 – Clark Wissler, American anthropologist, author, and educator (d. 1947)
1872 – Carl Friedberg, German-Italian pianist and educator (d. 1955)
  1872   – Adolf Schmal, Austrian fencer and cyclist (d. 1919)
1875 – Tomás Burgos, Chilean philanthropist (d. 1945)
1876 – James Scullin, Australian journalist and politician, 9th Prime Minister of Australia (d. 1953)
1878 – James O. Richardson, American admiral (d. 1974)
1883 – Gerald Tyrwhitt-Wilson, 14th Baron Berners, English composer, painter, and author (d. 1950)
1885 – Uzeyir Hajibeyov, Azerbaijani composer, conductor, and playwright (d. 1948)
1888 – Grey Owl, English-Canadian environmentalist and author (d. 1938)
  1888   – Toni Wolff, Swiss psychologist and author (d. 1953)
1889 – Doris Blackburn, Australian activist and politician (d. 1970)
  1889   – Leslie Morshead, Australian general, businessman, and educator (d. 1959)
1891 – Rafael Pérez y Pérez, Spanish author (d. 1984)
1893 – Arthur Benjamin, Australian pianist, composer, and conductor (d. 1960)
  1893   – William March, American soldier and author (d. 1954)
1894 – Fay Compton, English actress (d. 1978)
1895 – Jean Batmale, French footballer and manager (d. 1973)
  1895   – John Diefenbaker, Canadian lawyer and politician, 13th Prime Minister of Canada (d. 1979)
  1895   – Walter Koch, German astrologer and author (d. 1970)
  1895   – Tomoji Tanabe, Japanese super-centenarian (d. 2009)
1897 – Pablo Sorozábal, Spanish composer and conductor (d. 1988)
1900 – Willis Laurence James, American violinist and educator (d. 1966)
  1900   – Seewoosagur Ramgoolam, Mauritian philanthropist and politician, 1st Prime Minister of Mauritius (d. 1985)

1901–present
1901 – Harold Clurman, American director and producer (d. 1980)
1904 – Bun Cook, Canadian ice hockey player and coach (d. 1988)
  1904   – Jose de Rivera, American soldier and sculptor (d. 1985)
  1904   – David Eccles, 1st Viscount Eccles, English businessman and politician, Secretary of State for Education (d. 1999)
1905 – Eddie "Rochester" Anderson, American actor (d. 1977)
  1905   – Agnes de Mille, American dancer and choreographer (d. 1993)
  1905   – Greta Garbo, Swedish-American actress (d. 1990)
1906 – Kaka Hathrasi, Indian poet and author (d. 1995)
  1906   – Maurice Maillot, French actor (d. 1968) 
  1906   – Julio Rosales, Filipino cardinal (d. 1983)
1907 – Leon Askin, Austrian actor (d. 2005)
  1907   – Edwin McMillan, American physicist and chemist, Nobel Prize laureate (d. 1991)
1908 – Victor Ambartsumian, Georgian-Armenian astrophysicist, astronomer, and academic (d. 1996)
1910 – Josef Tal, Israeli pianist and composer (d. 2008)
1911 – Syd Howe, Canadian ice hockey player (d. 1976)
1912 – María de la Cruz, Chilean journalist and activist (d. 1995)
1914 – Jack Cardiff, English director, cinematographer, and photographer (d. 2009)
1916 – Rossano Brazzi, Italian actor (d. 1994)
  1916   – John Jacob Rhodes, American lawyer and politician (d. 2003)
1917 – June Foray, American actress and voice artist (d. 2017)
  1917   – Phil Taylor, English footballer and manager (d. 2012)
  1917   – Francis Parker Yockey, American lawyer and philosopher (d. 1960)
1918 – Johnny Mantz, American race car driver (d. 1972)
1919 – Tommy Hunter, American fiddler (d. 1993)
1920 – Jack Warden, American actor (d. 2006)
1922 – Hank Bagby, American saxophonist (d. 1993)
  1922   – Grayson Hall, American actress (d. 1985)
  1922   – Ray Steadman-Allen, English composer (d. 2014)
1923 – Queen Anne of Romania (d. 2016)
  1923   – Peter Smithson, English architect, co-designed Robin Hood Gardens (d. 2003)
  1923   – Bertha Wilson, Scottish-Canadian lawyer and jurist, 60th Puisne Justice of the Supreme Court of Canada (d. 2007)
1924 – J. D. Tippit, American police officer (d. 1963)
  1924   – Eloísa Mafalda, Brazilian actress (d. 2018)
1925 – Harvey Haddix, American baseball player and coach (d. 1994)
  1925   – Dorothy Wedderburn, English economist and academic (d. 2012)
1926 – Bud Greenspan, American director, producer, and screenwriter (d. 2010)
  1926   – Joe Kubert, American author and illustrator, founded The Kubert School (d. 2012)
1927 – Phyllis Kirk, American actress (d. 2006)
  1927   – Muriel Turner, Baroness Turner of Camden, English politician (d. 2018)
1929 – Teddi King, American singer (d. 1977)
  1929   – Nancy Littlefield, American director and producer (d. 2007)
1930 – John Tolos, Greek-Canadian wrestler (d. 2009)
1931 – Julio Grondona, Argentinian businessman (d. 2014)
1932 – Nikolay Rukavishnikov, Russian physicist and astronaut (d. 2002)
1933 – Bob Bennett, American soldier and politician (d. 2016)
  1933   – Robert Blake, American actor, producer, and screenwriter (d. 2023)
  1933   – Scotty Bowman, Canadian ice hockey player and coach
  1933   – Mark di Suvero, Italian-American sculptor
  1933   – Leonid Kharitonov, Russian actor and singer (d. 2017)
  1933   – Christopher Ricks, English scholar and critic
  1933   – Charles Roach, Trinidadian-Canadian lawyer and activist (d. 2012)
  1933   – Jimmie Rodgers, American singer-songwriter and guitarist (d. 2021)
  1933   – Fred Willard, American actor and comedian (d. 2020)
1935 – Peter Clarke, English cartoonist (d. 2012)
  1935   – John Spencer, English snooker player and sportscaster (d. 2006)
1936 – Big Tom, Irish singer-songwriter and guitarist (d. 2018)
1937 – Ralph Backstrom, Canadian ice hockey player and coach  (d. 2021)
  1937   – Ivy Matsepe-Casaburri, South African politician (d. 2009)
1938 – Billy Robinson, English-American wrestler and trainer (d. 2014)
1939 – Gerry Harvey, Australian businessman, co-founded Harvey Norman
  1939   – Jorge Sampaio, Portuguese lawyer and politician, 18th President of Portugal (d. 2021)
  1939   – Jan Camiel Willems, Belgian mathematician and theorist (d. 2013)
1940 – Frankie Avalon, American singer and actor
1942 – Şenes Erzik, Turkish businessman
1944 – Michael Franks, American singer-songwriter
  1944   – Rocío Jurado, Spanish singer and actress (d. 2006)
  1944   – Charles L. Veach, American colonel, pilot, and astronaut (d. 1995)
1945 – P. F. Sloan, American singer-songwriter and producer  (d. 2015)
  1945   – John McAfee, British-American computer programmer and businessman, founded McAfee (d. 2021)
1946 – Benjamín Brea, Spanish-Venezuelan saxophonist, clarinet player, and conductor (d. 2014)
  1946   – Nicholas Clay, English actor (d. 2000)
  1946   – Kelvin Coe, Australian ballet dancer (d. 1992)
  1946   – Meredith Oakes, Australian-English playwright, translator, and educator
  1946   – Gailard Sartain, American actor
1947 – Russ Abbot, English comedian, actor, and singer
  1947   – Drew Gilpin Faust, American historian and academic
  1947   – Giancarlo Minardi, Italian businessman, founded the Minardi Racing Team 
1948 – Lynn Abbey, American computer programmer and author
1949 – Kerry Livgren, American guitarist and songwriter
  1949   – Jim McCrery, American lawyer and politician
  1949   – Mo Mowlam, English academic and politician, Minister for the Cabinet Office (d. 2005)
  1949   – Peter Shilton, English footballer and manager
1950 – Siobhan Davies, English dancer and choreographer
  1950   – Vishnuvardhan, Indian actor (d. 2009)
  1950   – Chris Heister, Swedish politician, Governor of Stockholm County
  1950   – Darryl Sittler, Canadian ice hockey player
  1950   – Anna Deavere Smith, American actress and playwright
1951 – Ben Carson, American neurosurgeon, author, and politician
  1951   – Dee Dee Ramone, American singer-songwriter and bass player (d. 2002)
  1951   – Tony Scott, American baseball player and coach
  1951   – Darryl Stingley, American football player and scout (d. 2007)
  1951   – Marc Surer, Swiss racing driver and sportscaster
1952 – Giorgos Dimitrakopoulos, Greek politician
  1952   – Rick Pitino, American basketball player and coach
1953 – Carl Jackson, American singer-songwriter and producer
  1953   – John McGlinn, American conductor and historian (d. 2009)
1954 – Murtaza Bhutto, Pakistani politician (d. 1996)
  1954   – Takao Doi, Japanese engineer and astronaut
  1954   – Dennis Johnson, American basketball player and coach (d. 2007)
  1954   – Steven Pinker, Canadian-American psychologist, linguist, and author
  1954   – Tommy Tuberville, American football player and coach
1955 – Paul Butler, English bishop
  1955   – Keith Morris, American singer-songwriter 
1956 – Chris Hedges, American journalist and author
  1956   – Peter Šťastný, Slovak ice hockey player and politician
  1956   – Anant Gadgil, Indian politician
1958 – John Aldridge, English-Irish footballer and manager
  1958   – Winston Davis, Vincentian cricketer
  1958   – Malcolm Press, English ecologist and academic
  1958   – Derek Pringle, Kenyan-English cricketer and journalist
1959 – Ian Arkwright, English footballer
  1959   – Mark Romanek, American director and screenwriter
  1959   – Ryne Sandberg, American baseball player, coach, and manager
1960 – Stephen Flaherty, American composer
  1960   – Carolyn Harris, British politician
  1960   – Ian Lucas, English lawyer and politician
  1960   – Blue Panther, Mexican wrestler
1961 – James Gandolfini, American actor and producer (d. 2013)
  1961   – Konstantin Kakanias, Greek-American painter and illustrator
  1961   – Mark Olson, American singer-songwriter and guitarist 
1962 – Joanne Catherall, English singer 
  1962   – John Fashanu, English footballer and manager
  1962   – John Mann, Canadian singer-songwriter, guitarist, and actor (d. 2019)
  1962   – Aden Ridgeway, Australian public servant and politician
  1962   – Boris Said, American race car driver
1963 – Jim Pocklington, English racing driver
  1963   – John Powell, English-Canadian composer and conductor
  1963   – Dan Povenmire, American animator
1964 – Jens Henschel, German footballer
  1964   – Marco Masini, Italian singer-songwriter
  1964   – Holly Robinson Peete, American actress and singer
1966 – Tom Chorske, American ice hockey player and sportscaster
1967 – Tara Fitzgerald, English actress
1968 – Toni Kukoč, Croatian basketball player 
  1968   – Upendra Rao, Indian actor, director, and politician
1969 – Brad Beven, Australian triathlete
  1969   – Cappadonna, American rapper
1970 – Mike Compton, American football player and coach
  1970   – Dan Eldon, English photographer and journalist (d. 1993)
  1970   – Darren Gough, English cricketer
  1970   – Aisha Tyler, American actress, television host, and author
1971 – Lance Armstrong, American cyclist
  1971   – Anna Netrebko, Russian-Austrian soprano and actress
  1971   – Jada Pinkett Smith, American actress
1972 – Brigitte Becue, Belgian swimmer
  1972   – Adam Cohen, Canadian singer-songwriter and guitarist 
  1972   – David Jefferies, English motorcycle racer (d. 2003)
  1972   – Iain Stewart, Scottish accountant and politician
1973 – Paul Brousseau, Canadian ice hockey player
  1973   – Mário Jardel, Brazilian footballer
  1973   – James Marsden, American actor 
  1973   – Ami Onuki, Japanese singer and voice actress 
  1973   – Louise Sauvage, Australian wheelchair racer
  1973   – Mark Shuttleworth, South African-English businessman 
  1973   – Aitor Karanka, Spanish footballer and manager
1974 – Sol Campbell, English footballer and politician
  1974   – Damon Jones, American football player and coach
  1974   – Ticha Penicheiro, Portuguese basketball player
  1974   – Xzibit, American rapper, actor, and television host
1975 – Kanstantsin Lukashyk, Belarusian target shooter
  1975   – Jason Sudeikis, American actor and comedian
  1975   – Guillermo Vargas, Costa Rican photographer and painter
1976 – Gabriel Gervais, Canadian soccer player
  1976   – Ronaldo, Brazilian footballer
1977 – Kieran West, English rower 
1978 – Iain Lees-Galloway, New Zealand politician 
  1978   – Augustine Simo, Cameroonian footballer
1979 – Daniel Aranzubia, Spanish footballer
  1979   – Robert Pruett, American criminal (d. 2017) 
1980 – Mickey Higham, English rugby league player
  1980   – Avi Strool, Israeli footballer
  1980   – Petri Virtanen, Finnish basketball player
1981 – Jennifer Tisdale, American actress and singer
  1981   – Kristaps Valters, Latvian basketball player
  1981   – Han Ye-seul, South Korean actress
1982 – Alessandro Cibocchi, Italian footballer
  1982   – Arvydas Eitutavičius, Lithuanian basketball player
  1982   – Leono, Mexican wrestler
  1982   – Alfredo Talavera, Mexican footballer
1984 – Anthony Gonzalez, American football player and politician
  1984   – Dizzee Rascal, British hip hop musician
1987 – Seiko Oomori, Japanese singer-songwriter
1989 – Serge Ibaka, Congolese-Spanish basketball player
1990 – Lewis Holtby, German footballer
1998 – Christian Pulisic, American soccer player
2003 – Ana Galindo, Mexican rhythmic gymnast

Deaths

Pre-1600
96 – Domitian, Roman emperor (b. AD 51)
411 – Constantine III, Roman usurper 
 869 – Wenilo, Frankish archbishop
 887 – Pietro I Candiano, doge of Venice (b. 842)
 893 – Zhang Xiong, Chinese warlord 
 958 – Liu Sheng, Chinese emperor (b. 920)
1137 – Eric II, king of Denmark
1180 – Louis VII, king of France (b. 1120)
1261 – Konrad von Hochstaden, archbishop of Cologne
1302 – Eudokia Palaiologina, empress of Trebizond (b. c. 1265)
1345 – Andrew, Duke of Calabria (b. 1327)
1361 – Louis V, duke of Bavaria (b. 1315)
1385 – Balša II, ruler of Zeta
1443 – Lewis of Luxembourg, archbishop of Rouen 
1598 – Toyotomi Hideyoshi, Japanese daimyō (b. 1536)

1601–1900
1630 – Melchior Klesl, Austrian cardinal (b. 1552)
1675 – Charles IV, Duke of Lorraine (b. 1604)
1721 – Matthew Prior, English poet, politician, and diplomat, British Ambassador to France (b. 1664)
1722 – André Dacier, French scholar and academic (b. 1651)
1783 – Leonhard Euler, Swiss mathematician and physicist (b. 1707)
  1783   – Benjamin Kennicott, English theologian and scholar (b. 1718)
1792 – August Gottlieb Spangenberg, German bishop and theologian (b. 1704)
1812 – Safranbolulu Izzet Mehmet Pasha, Ottoman politician, 186th Grand Vizier of the Ottoman Empire (b. 1743)
1830 – William Hazlitt, English philosopher, painter, and critic (b. 1778)
1857 – Karol Kurpiński, Polish composer and conductor (b. 1785)
1860 – Joseph Locke, English engineer and politician (b. 1805)
1862 – Joseph K. Mansfield, American general (b. 1803)
1872 – Charles XV of Sweden (b. 1826)
1890 – Dion Boucicault, Irish-American actor and playwright (b. 1820)
1896 – Hippolyte Fizeau, French physicist and academic (b. 1819)

1901–present
1905 – George MacDonald, Scottish minister, author, and poet (b. 1824)
1909 – Grigore Tocilescu, Romanian archaeologist and historian (b. 1850)
1911 – Pyotr Stolypin, Russian lawyer and politician, 3rd Prime Minister of Russia (b. 1862)
1915 – Susan La Flesche Picotte, doctor, teacher, and social reformer, first Native American to earn a medical degree
1924 – F. H. Bradley, English philosopher and author (b. 1846)
1939 – Stanisław Ignacy Witkiewicz, Polish author, painter, and photographer (b. 1885)
1941 – Fred Karno, English actor and screenwriter (b. 1866)
1944 – Robert G. Cole, American colonel, Medal of Honor recipient (b. 1915)
1945 – Volin, Russian anarchist intellectual (b. 1882)
1949 – Frank Morgan, American actor (b. 1890)
1951 – Gelett Burgess, American author and poet (b. 1866)
1952 – Frances Alda, New Zealand-Australian soprano and actress (b. 1879)
1953 – Charles de Tornaco, Belgian racing driver (b. 1927)
1956 – Adélard Godbout, Canadian agronomist and politician, 15th Premier of Quebec (b. 1892)
1958 – Olaf Gulbransson, Norwegian painter and illustrator (b. 1873)
1959 – Benjamin Péret, French poet and journalist (b. 1899)
1961 – Dag Hammarskjöld, Swedish economist and diplomat, 2nd Secretary-General of the United Nations, Nobel Prize laureate (b. 1905)
1962 – Therese Neumann, German mystic (b. 1898)
1964 – Seán O'Casey, Irish dramatist and memoirist (b. 1880)
1967 – John Cockcroft, English physicist and academic, Nobel Prize laureate (b. 1897)
1968 – Franchot Tone, American actor, singer, and producer (b. 1905)
1970 – Jimi Hendrix, American singer-songwriter, guitarist, and producer (b. 1942)
1974 – Amanat Ali Khan, Pakistani classical singer (b. 1922)
1975 – Fairfield Porter, American painter and critic (b. 1907)
1977 – Paul Bernays, English-Swiss mathematician and philosopher (b. 1888)
1980 – Katherine Anne Porter, American short story writer, novelist, and essayist (b. 1890)
1987 – Américo Tomás, Portuguese admiral and politician, 14th President of Portugal (b. 1894)
1988 – Alan Watt, Australian public servant and diplomat, Australian Ambassador to Japan (b. 1901)
1992 – Mohammad Hidayatullah, Indian lawyer, judge, and politician, 6th Vice President of India (b. 1905)
1997 – Jimmy Witherspoon, American singer (b. 1920)
1998 – Charlie Foxx, American singer and guitarist (Inez and Charlie Foxx) (b. 1939)
2001 – Ernie Coombs, American-Canadian television host (b. 1927)
2002 – Bob Hayes, American sprinter and football player (b. 1942)
  2002   – Mauro Ramos, Brazilian footballer and manager (b. 1930)
  2002   – Margita Stefanović, Serbian keyboard player (b. 1959)
2003 – Emil Fackenheim, German rabbi and philosopher (b. 1916)
  2003   – Bob Mitchell, English educator and politician (b. 1927)
2004 – Norman Cantor, Canadian-American historian and educator (b. 1929)
  2004   – Russ Meyer, American director, producer, and screenwriter (b. 1922)
2005 – Michael Park, English racing driver (b. 1966)
  2005   – Clint C. Wilson, Sr., American cartoonist (b. 1914)
2006 – Edward J. King, American football player, lawyer, and politician, 66th Governor of Massachusetts (b. 1925)
2007 – Pepsi Tate, Welsh bass player and producer (b. 1965)
2008 – Leo de Berardinis, Italian actor and director (b. 1940)
  2008   – Mauricio Kagel, Argentinian-German composer and educator (b. 1931)
  2008   – Ron Lancaster, American-Canadian football player and coach (b. 1938)
2011 – Jamey Rodemeyer, American teenage activist (b. 1997)
2012 – Santiago Carrillo, Spanish theorist and politician (b. 1915)
  2012   – Haim Hefer, Polish-Israeli songwriter and poet (b. 1925)
  2012   – Jack Kralick, American baseball player (b. 1935)
  2012   – Steve Sabol, American director and producer, co-founded NFL Films (b. 1942)
2013 – Veliyam Bharghavan, Indian politician (b. 1928)
  2013   – Lindsay Cooper, English composer, bassoon and oboe player (b. 1951)
  2013   – Arthur Lamothe, French-Canadian director, producer, and screenwriter (b. 1928)
  2013   – Ken Norton, American boxer (b. 1943)
  2013   – Marcel Reich-Ranicki, Polish-German author and critic (b. 1920)
  2013   – Richard C. Sarafian, American actor, director, and screenwriter (b. 1930)
2014 – Milan Marcetta, Canadian ice hockey player (b. 1936)
  2014   – Earl Ross, Canadian racing driver (b. 1941)
  2014   – Hirofumi Uzawa, Japanese economist and academic (b. 1928)
  2014   – Kenny Wheeler, Canadian-English trumpet player and composer (b. 1930)
2015 – Eduardo Bonvallet, Chilean footballer and manager (b. 1955)
  2015   – James R. Houck, American astrophysicist and academic (b. 1940)
  2015   – Mario Benjamín Menéndez, Argentinian general and politician (b. 1930)
2017 – Afzal Ahsan Randhawa, Pakistani writer, poet, translator and playwright (b. 1937)
2020 – Ruth Bader Ginsburg, United States Supreme Court justice (b. 1933)
2021 – Jolidee Matongo, South African politician, 97th Mayor of Johannesburg (b. 1975)
  2021   – Chris Anker Sørensen, Danish road bicycle racer (b. 1984)

Holidays and observances
 Christian feast day:
 Constantius (Theban Legion)
 Edward Bouverie Pusey (Episcopal Church)
 Eustorgius I
 Joseph of Cupertino
 Juan Macias
 Methodius of Olympus
 Richardis
 September 18 (Eastern Orthodox liturgics)
 Day of National Music (Azerbaijan)
 Island Language Day (Okinawa Prefecture, Japan)
 National Day or Dieciocho (Chile)
 National HIV/AIDS and Aging Awareness Day (United States)
 Navy Day (Croatia)
 World Water Monitoring Day

References

External links

 
 
 

Days of the year
September